

Events 
January 1 – Première of William Boyce's "When rival nations great in arms", at St James's Palace, London.
January 14 – Wolfgang Amadeus Mozart, while visiting Mannheim, meets local composer Georg Joseph Vogler.
January 27 – Niccolò Piccinni's first French opera, Roland, is premièred at the Paris Opera.
February 14 – Wolfgang Amadeus Mozart writes to his father, Leopold Mozart, telling him how much he hates composing for the flute.
February 17 – Ignaz Umlauf’s Die Bergknappen becomes the first singspiel by a local composer to be performed in Vienna.
March 1 – Christoph Willibald Gluck returns to Vienna after a residence of ten years in Paris.
March 2 – The Nationaltheater of Vienna's opera buffa company gives its final performance.
March 15 – Thomas Arne is buried at St Paul's, Covent Garden, London.
March 20 – Jiří Antonín Benda leaves his post as Kapellmeister at the court of Ernest II, Duke of Saxe-Coburg and Gotha.
March 26 – Seven-year-old Ludwig van Beethoven gives his first concert performance, at Cologne.
April 8 – Antonio Salieri leaves Vienna after a twelve-year absence from his native Italy.
May 1 – Anna Maria Mozart complains of various ailments in a letter from Paris, where she is accompanying her son Wolfgang. She dies here on July 3.
June 4 – King George III of the United Kingdom celebrates his 40th birthday; "Arm’d with her native force", an ode composed by William Boyce for the occasion, is performed for the first time. 
July 9 – Mozart writes to his father complaining about the French language and the poor standard of singing.
July 13 – Leopold Mozart learns of his wife's death from a family friend, Abbé Joseph Bullinger.
July 24 – The première of Giovanni Paisiello’s Lo sposo burlato takes place at the Russian court.
August 1 – First publication (in London) of the song "To Anacreon in Heaven" with words by Ralph Tomlinson (d. March 17). Date of writing and first publication of the music by John Stafford Smith which becomes "The Star-Spangled Banner" is uncertain but probably about this time.
August 3 – Teatro alla Scala, Milan, opens with a performance of Antonio Salieri's latest opera, Europa riconosciuta. 
August 27 – Mozart meets Johann Christian Bach in Paris.
October 14 – Wolfgang Amadeus Mozart arrives in Strasbourg, where he will give three concerts.

Classical music 
Carl Philip Emanuel Bach 
Harpsichord Concerto in G major, H.477
Harpsichord Concerto in D major, H.478
Sechs Clavier-Sonaten für Kenner und Liebhaber
Johann Christian Bach – 4 Sonatas and 2 Duetts, Op. 15
Jean-Frédéric Edelmann – 3 Sonates, Op. 6, for harpsichord
Felice Giardini 
6 String Trios, Op. 20
6 Quartets, Op. 21
François Joseph Gossec – Symphonie concertante in F major No. 2, "à plusieurs instruments"
Joseph Haydn 
Little Organ Mass
Symphony No.54 in G major, Hob.I:54
Il maestro e lo scolare, Hob.XVIIa:1
František Kocžwara – The Battle of Prague, Op. 23
Wolfgang Amadeus Mozart 
Oboe Concerto in F major, K.293/416f
Duet Sonata for violin and piano K.296
Concerto for flute and harp in C major, K. 299
Violin Sonatas No. 18-23, K. 301-306
Ah se in ciel, K.538
Symphony No. 31 in D "Paris"
Joseph Bologne Saint-Georges – 2 Symphonies concertantes, Op. 13
Antonio Salieri – Sinfonia Veneziana
Johann Abraham Peter Schulz – Keyboard Sonata in E-flat major, Op. 2
Hans Hinrich Zielche – 6 Flute Sonatas

Opera 
Carl Christian Agthe – Martin Velten
Johann Christian Bach – La Clemenza di Scipione
Anton Bachschmidt – Antigono
Pierre Joseph Candeille – Les Deux comtesses
Christian Cannabich – Azakia
Domenico Cimarosa 
Il ritorno di Don Calandrino
Le stravaganze d'amore
Charles Dibdin – The Shepherdess of the Alps
André Grétry – Le jugement de Midas
Niccola Piccinni – Roland
Antonio Sacchini – Erifile
Antonio Salieri
Europa riconosciuta
La scuola de' gelosi

Published popular music 
The Singing Master's Assistant – William Billings, including "Africa"

Methods and theory writings 

 William Billings – The Singing Master's Assistant
 Johann Nikolaus Forkel – Musikalisch-kritische Bibliothek
 Mussard – Nouveaux principes pour apprendre a jouer de la Flutte Traversiere
 Ignacio Ramoneda – Arte de canto-llano

Births 
January 5 – Fortunato Santini, composer
January 9 – Dede Efendi, composer
January 13 – Anton Fischer, composer
February 12 – Franz Joseph Volkert, composer
February 14 – Fernando Sor, guitarist and composer
February 17 – Vincenzo Pucitta, Italian composer (d. 1861)
March 8 – Friedrich August Kanne, composer and music critic(d. 1833)
April 6 – Joseph Funk, composer and music teacher (d. 1862)
May 8 – Johann Gansbacher, composer (d. 1844)
May 28 – Friedrich Westenholz, composer
July 10 – Sigismund Ritter von Neukomm, Austrian composer and royal kapellmeister (d. 1858)
July 29 – Carl Borromaus Neuner
September 3 – Jean Nicolas Auguste Kreutzer, composer
November 14 – Johann Nepomuk Hummel, composer

Deaths 
February 15 – Johann Gottlieb Görner, organist and composer (b. 1697)
March 5 – Thomas Arne, composer, best known for "Rule Britannia" (b. 1710)
May 8 – Lorenz Christoph Mizler, physician and music writer (b. 1711)
July 2 – Jean-Jacques Rousseau, philosopher, writer and composer (b. 1712)
July 3 – Anna Maria Mozart, mother of Wolfgang Amadeus Mozart (b. 1720; typhoid)
August 5 – Thomas Linley the younger, composer, aged 22
August 14 – Augustus Montague Toplady, hymn-writer (b. 1740)
August 24 – Johannes Ringk, organist, composer and copyist of Bach (b. 1717)
September 20 – Quirino Gasparini, composer (b. 1721)
October 30 – Davide Perez, opera composer (b. 1711)
November 11 – Anne Steele, hymn-writer (b. 1717)
December – Samuel Linley, oboist and singer (b. 1760)
December 12 – Hermann Raupach, composer (b. 1728)
date unknown
Americus Backers, piano maker 
Giovanni Battista Costanzi, Italian composer (born 1704)
Célestin Harst, organist and harpsichordist (b. 1698)

References

 
18th century in music
Music by year